The Reserve Logistics Support Brigade of Hebei, originally activated as the Reserve Division of Langfang in October 1984, at Langfang, Hebei is a reserve infantry formation of the People's Liberation Army.

The division was composed of three infantry regiments and one artillery regiment. In November 1985, the division was redesignated as the Reserve Infantry Division of Langfang.

The division was then composed of:
1st Infantry Regiment - Gu'an
2nd Infantry Regiment - Yongqing
3rd Infantry Regiment - Ba County
Artillery Regiment

In December 1998, the division was reorganized as the Reserve Logistics Support Brigade of Hebei.

References

Brigades of the People's Liberation Army
Military logistics units and formations of China
Army logistics units and formations
Military units and formations established in 1984